This is a list of Italian Ministers of Budget, from 1947 to 1997. The first Minister of Budget was Luigi Einaudi, the last one was Carlo Azeglio Ciampi.

List of Ministers of Budget
 Parties
1946–1994:

Since 1994:

 Governments

References

Budget